Reality Check Network was a diskmag warez magazine that existed from November 18, 1995, to Summer 1997 with two breaks in Spring 1996 and Winter 1996/1997.

With origins as a promotional magazine for the Legacy group, it evolved into a general magazine describing various aspects of the warez scene. It contained interviews with key group leaders and described gossip and fights in the warez world. They would list each period's various releases, FTP and BBS courier MB totals, and up-to-date NFO files for each group. This was during a period when private Internet accounts were becoming widespread in the United States and increasingly in Europe and the Internet-based warez scene was expanding rapidly. They also had an open IRC channel #rcn where people would gossip about the activities of various groups under the watch of the magazine's chief editor Rebel Chicken.

Its front-end and graphical design were considered excellent and based on efficient assembly code. The magazine also sometimes embedded small games like space shooters into the code. As the magazine became more sophisticated in its graphics, its size in kilobytes grew, but until close to its end fit onto a single floppy disk.

It was controversial for its frank discussion of government busts and its indirect involvement in various feuds. Although it was frequently criticized for this and other various reasons, most groups interacted with it because of its popularity.

Issues 

 RCN 1 - "MindCrash Who?" - 18 November 1995
 2 - "Malice #1?" - 25 November 1995
 3 - "Fake Releases" - 2 December 1995
 4 - "TDU-Jam Retires" - 9 December 1995
 5 - "Hybrid's WarCraft 2" - 15 December 1995
 6 - "Drink or Die vs Demolition" - 22 December 1995
 7 - "Best of 1995" - 31 December 1995
 8 - "Exclusive FBI Interview" - 7 January 1996
 9 - "Hybrid Leaders on the Warpath" - 14 January 1996
 10 - "Passing Of Spyder-X" - 21 January 1996
 11 - "Anarchist Bust" - 28 January 1996
 12 - "Apogee/Distinct" - 4 February 1996
 13 - "Farewell" - 11 February 1996
 14 - "James Makes His Visit" - 19 May 1996
 15 - "Malice Downfall" - 26 May 1996
 16 - "Passing of Zieg" - 2 June 1996
 17 - "Dr Jekyll Busted" - 7 June 1996
 18 - "GODS Meeting Logs" - 16 June 1996
 19 - "Chris Carter Revealed" - 23 June 1996
 20 - "Amnesia Falls" - 30 June 1996
 21 - "ROR Dead? I wish" - 7 July 1996
 Reality Check Network Theme Pack - "Designed for Windows 95" - 7 July 1996
 22 - "United Cracking Force" - 14 July 1996
 23 - "Amnesia's Catch 22?" - 21 July 1996
 24 - "AMN vs. RISC" - 4 August 1996
 25 - "DOD vs. MTY" - 18 August 1996
 26 - "Group Trickery?" - 1 September 1996
 27 - "Rebel Chicken No More?" - 20 October 1996
 28 - "Rebel Chicken No More?" - 20 October 1996
 29 - "Orion's New PWA!" - 26 October 1996
 30 - "Razor Busts Supplier" - 11 November 1996
 30 - "Art Edition" - 13 November 1996
 31 - "One Year Anniversary" - 24 November 1996
 32 - "The End of a Chapter" - 8 December 1996
 33 - "We're Back" - 6 April 1997
 34 - "The Kings of the Scene" - 20 April 1997
 35 - "The Death of Reflux" - 4 May 1997
 35 - "Art Edition" - 11 May 1997
 36 - "X-Force versus GLOW" - 18 May 1997
 36 - "Art Edition" - 25 May 1997
 37 - "Lester Removed From DOD" - 25 June 1997
 37 - "Art Edition" - 29 June 1997
 38 - "Another Chapter Ends" - 13 July 1997
 38 - "Art Edition" - 31 August 1997

External links 
 Internet Archive has a complete collection of these

Warez
Disk magazines